Henson Springs, also known as Cobb Town, Hansons Springs, or Webb, is an unincorporated community in Lamar County, Alabama, United States.

History
Henson Springs, along with the previous community names of Cobb Town, and Webb, are all named for local families. A post office operated under the name Henson Springs from 1892 to 1893.

References 

Unincorporated communities in Lamar County, Alabama
Unincorporated communities in Alabama